Corporal Kenneth Horsfield GC (1920-1944) of the Manchester Regiment was posthumously awarded the George Cross for '...most conspicuous gallantry' shown in attempting to rescue a comrade trapped and injured by an explosion in Italy in 1945.

He enlisted in 1939 and also served in North Africa.  He is buried in Bari War Cemetery.

18 August 1944
In the early afternoon of 18 August 1944, an ammunition explosion in the demolition area of Military Establishment 54 (ME 54, Mil. Est. 54) in Brindisi killed two men and injured three more.

Horsfield ran to the scene, with ammunition exploding all around him. He was unable to release one injured man but Horsfield ran to fetch a fire extinguisher to try and control the fire when it became exhausted. A second explosion occurred causing him injuries from which he died on his way to hospital.

The Commanding Officer of ME54 said, "In view of the great sacrifice this soldier made, to save the life of another, and with full knowledge of the likelihood of another fatal explosion, I have no hesitation in recommending him for the posthumous award of the George Cross".

ME 54 was also known, particularly to the American OSS, as Paradise Camp. He was killed during this action by a second explosion.

There is no evidence to support the suggestion that he was a member of the SAS.

George Cross citation
Notice of his award appeared in the London Gazette on 23 March 1945.

References

External links
CWGC entry

1944 deaths
People from Hyde, Greater Manchester
Manchester Regiment soldiers
British recipients of the George Cross
British Army personnel killed in World War II
1920 births
Military personnel from Cheshire